The New York City mayoral election of 1953 occurred on Tuesday, November 3, 1953, with the Democratic candidate, Manhattan Borough President Robert F. Wagner, Jr. winning a decisive plurality in a three-way race.

Wagner defeated the Republican nominee, lawyer and Postmaster of New York City, Harold Riegelman, as well as the Liberal Party nominee, New York City Council President Rudolph Halley.

Halley additionally ran on the Independent Citizens ballot line.

Wagner enjoyed the support of the powerful Tammany Hall political machine, easily securing him a victory.

Wagner received 46.33% of the vote to Riegelman's 29.97%, a Democratic victory margin of 16.36%. Halley finished in third with 21.16%.

Wagner won comfortable pluralities in Manhattan, Brooklyn, and the Bronx, and won a majority in Staten Island. Riegelman won a razor-thin plurality in Queens.

Wagner would be sworn into the first of his three terms in January 1954, replacing outgoing independent Mayor Vincent R. Impellitteri.

Results

Total vote was 2,207,516
Other vote was David L. Weiss-Socialist Workers-2,054 (0.1%);Nathan Karp-Industrial Government-916; Scattered-180.
"Industrial Government" is a ballot title sometimes used, to avoid confusion or to meet election laws, by the Socialist Labor Party. The Liberal Party of New York won over five times as many votes as the American Labor Party in Manhattan, and eight-to-ten times as many in the other boroughs. The ALP lost its ballot status after the 1954 Governor's race, and voted to dissolve itself in 1956.

References

Mayoral election
Mayoral elections in New York City
New York City mayoral
New York City
New York City mayoral election